Quicentro Sur is a shopping mall located south of Quito that opened in August 2010. It is the largest mall in Ecuador.

References 

Buildings and structures in Quito
Tourist attractions in Quito
Shopping malls in Ecuador
Shopping malls established in 2010
2010 establishments in Ecuador